"Give Me Love" is the seventh Japanese single (counted as sixth) by the South Korean boy band 2PM. It was released on May 29, 2013 in three different editions. The single also includes "Falling in Love (composed by Jun K.) as B-side track, which was supposed to be included in Masquerade.

"Give Me Love" serves as the theme song of the television drama series Take Five (Boku tachi wa Ai wo Nesumeru ka), starring Karasawa Toshiaki, Matsuyuki Yasuko and SMAP’s Inagaki Goro.

Track listing

Charts

Oricon

Release history

References

2013 singles
Dance-pop songs
Japanese-language songs
2PM songs
Ariola Japan singles
2012 songs
Songs written by Michael Yano